Thomas William Torney (2 July 1915 – 21 October 1998) was a British Labour Party politician.

Tourney joined the Labour Party, and in 1945 became its election agent for Wembley North.  The following year, he began working full-time for the Union of Shop, Distributive and Allied Workers (USDAW) as its Derby and District Area Organiser, although he took time out at the 1964 United Kingdom general election to act as election agent in West Derbyshire.

Torney was Member of Parliament for Bradford South from 1970 until his retirement at the 1987 general election.  His successor was Bob Cryer.  In the 1983 general election, Torney had narrowly evaded defeat to the Conservative landslide by 110 votes. The BBC Election Night programme that year later reported that he was taken ill at the count and rushed to hospital.

References

The Times Guide to the House of Commons, Times Newspapers Ltd, 1983 & 1987

External links 
 

1915 births
1998 deaths
Labour Party (UK) MPs for English constituencies
UK MPs 1970–1974
UK MPs 1974
UK MPs 1974–1979
UK MPs 1979–1983
UK MPs 1983–1987
Politicians from Bradford